The Planning and Compulsory Purchase Act 2004 (c 5) is an Act of the Parliament of the United Kingdom. It was promoted by the Office of the Deputy Prime Minister. It substantially reforms the town planning and compulsory purchase framework in the United Kingdom.

It both amended and repealed significant parts of the existing planning and compulsory purchase legislation in force at the time, including the Town and Country Planning Act 1990, and introduced reforms such as the abolition of Local Plans and Structure Plans, and their replacement with Local Development Frameworks.

History
The Act took over 18 months to negotiate its passage through Parliament and required special dispensation both to be carried over from one parliamentary session to another and to prevent it being lost on one occasion due to an error in the wording of a Commons motion.

The bill was introduced in the House of Commons in December 2002. It was re-committed to Commons committee to allow the inclusion of significant new material relating to the removal of Crown immunity and compulsory purchase and carried over to the following session.

The Act received royal assent on 13 May 2004 and came into force in mid July 2004; regulations implementing the parts of the Act reforming development plans came into force shortly afterwards.

The remaining sections of the Act are being implemented by further regulations and development orders.

Structure
Part 1 - Regional Functions
Part 2 - Local Development
Part 3 - Development
Part 4 - Development Control
Part 5 - Correction of Errors
Part 6 - Wales
Part 7 - Crown Application of Planning Acts
Chapter 1 - England and Wales
Chapter 2 - Scotland
Part 8 - Compulsory Purchase
Part 9 - Miscellaneous and General

References

Sources
The planning Portal

UK Legislation

Explanatory notes to the Planning and Compulsory Purchase Act 2004.

United Kingdom Acts of Parliament 2004
Housing in England
United Kingdom planning law
Eminent domain
Housing in Wales
English property law
Acts of the Parliament of the United Kingdom concerning England and Wales
2004 in England